Willard Zebedee "Bud" Estey  (October 10, 1919 – January 25, 2002) was a Canadian justice of the Supreme Court of Canada.

Estey was born in Saskatoon, Saskatchewan. He was the son of James Wilfred Estey, a puisne justice of the Supreme Court of Canada, and Muriel Baldwin. He studied at the University of Saskatchewan earning a BA in 1940 and an LL.B in 1942. He joined the armed forces and fought during World War II, including acting as a Canadian Observer with US forces during the battle for Okinawa. Upon returning to Canada went to study at Harvard Law School and received a LL.M in 1946.

From 1946 he taught at the University of Saskatchewan and then moved to Ontario the following year to practice law. In 1973, he was appointed to the Court of Appeal for Ontario and two years later was named Chief Justice of the High Court of Justice of Ontario. He became Chief Justice of Ontario in 1976. He was appointed to the Supreme Court of Canada in 1977 to replace Wilfred Judson.

He drafted the first major judgment on the Canadian Charter of Rights and Freedoms, the Skapinker judgment, in 1984.

Willard Estey retired from the Supreme Court of Canada in 1988.

Estey was appointed a trustee of the Stanley Cup in 1984 on the nomination of Red Dutton, succeeding Clarence Campbell.  In 1985, he was appointed as Commissioner of Inquiry into the collapses of the Canadian Commercial Bank and the Northland Bank, both of which had been closed by the Canadian government that year.  His report, Report of the Inquiry into the Collapse of the CCB and Northland Bank, was issued in 1986.

Honours
 In 1977 he was awarded an honorary Doctor of Laws from Wilfrid Laurier University.
 In 1979 he was awarded an honorary Doctor of Laws from University of Toronto.
 In 1984 he was awarded an honorary Doctor of Laws from the University of Saskatchewan.
 In 1990 he was made a Companion of the Order of Canada.

Opinions
 Labatt Breweries v. Canada (Attorney General), [1980] 1 S.C.R. 914
 Law Society of Upper Canada v. Skapinker, [1984] 1 S.C.R. 357
 R. v. Canadian Dredge & Dock Co. [1985] 1 S.C.R. 662
 Multiple Access Ltd v McCutcheon [1982] 2 SCR 161

References

 

1919 births
2002 deaths
Canadian university and college chancellors
Companions of the Order of Canada
Harvard Law School alumni
Justices of the Supreme Court of Canada
People from Saskatoon
University of Saskatchewan alumni
University of Saskatchewan College of Law alumni
Canadian military personnel of World War II